Arthur Seymour is the name of:

Arthur Seymour (botanist) (1859–1933), American botanist
Arthur Seymour (footballer), English footballer
Arthur Seymour (politician) (1832–1923), New Zealand politician